Mobin Master is an Australian DJ and producer. His version of the Robin S. song "Show Me Love" (August 2007) peaked at No. 7 on the ARIA Club Tracks chart and stayed in the top 50 for 52 weeks. It was nominated for the 2008 ARIA Award for Best Dance Release and reached No. 25 on ARIA's End of Year Top 50 Club Tracks chart in 2007.

Master is the owner of the Australian independent record label Safari Music.

Discography

Albums

Compilation albums

Singles

Awards and nominations

ARIA Music Awards
The ARIA Music Awards is an annual awards ceremony that recognises excellence, innovation, and achievement across all genres of Australian music..

|-
| 2008 || "Show Me Love" || ARIA Award for Best Dance Release || 
|-

References

Living people
Australian DJs
Australian record producers
Electronic dance music DJs
Date of birth missing (living people)
Year of birth missing (living people)